Sandesh ( Shôndesh) is a dessert, originating from the Bengal region in the eastern part of the Indian subcontinent, created with milk and sugar. Some recipes of sandesh call for the use of chhena or paneer (which is made by curdling the milk and separating the whey from it) instead of milk itself. Some people in the region of Dhaka make a form of sandesh called pranahara (literally 'heart stealer') which is softer and made with mawa and yogurt. The Gupo/Gufo style of sandesh from Guptipara is considered by some to be the "first branded sweet of Bengal".

History

A sweet dish by the name sandesh is mentioned in medieval Bengali literature, including Krittibas' Ramayana and lyrics of Chaitanya. However, the ingredients of this original dish are not known. This dish was most likely made of solidified kheer, thus being different from the modern chhena-based sandesh.

It is hard to determine when exactly sandesh started referring mainly to the chhena-based sweet instead of the kheer-based sweet. However, it is known that by the second half of the 19th century, sandesh commonly referred to the chhena-based sweet.

Preparation

Sandesh can be made with the use of chhena or paneer. The simplest kind of sandesh in Bengal is the makha sandesh (makha, meaning 'kneaded'). It is prepared by tossing the chhena lightly with sugar over low heat. When shaped into balls, it is called Kanchagolla (kancha, meaning 'raw' and golla, meaning 'ball'). For more complex and elaborately prepared sandesh, the chhena is dried and pressed, flavored with fruit, and sometimes even colored, and cooked to many different consistencies. Sometimes it is filled with syrup, blended with coconut or kheer, and molded into a variety of shapes such as conch shells, elephants, and fish. Another variant is nolen gurer sandesh, which is made with gur or jaggery. It is known for its brown or caramel colour that comes from nolen gur.

References

External links

 Sweetmeats on Banglapedia 

Bengali cuisine
Indian desserts
Sweets of West Bengal
Bangladeshi desserts